Leon Thomson King (born 14 January 2004) is a Scottish professional footballer who plays as a defender for Rangers.

Career

Club 
King joined Rangers in his early years, soon appearing to be one of the club's brightest prospects. He made his Rangers Under-20s debut aged only 14 under the management of Graeme Murty in November 2018. At the end of the 2018-19 season, he was also part of the squad that won the Scottish Youth Cup against Celtic.

King made his Rangers debut on 29 November 2020 in a League Cup match against Falkirk. He made his Scottish Premiership debut for on 12 May 2021, replacing Joe Aribo in the 86th minute of a 3–0 away win against Livingston.

On 5 January 2022, King signed a contract extension until the summer of 2024 and was subsequently promoted to the first-team squad on a full time basis.

International 
King was selected for the Scotland under-21 squad in May 2022.

Career statistics

Honours
Rangers
Scottish Premiership: 2020–21
Scottish Cup: 2021–22
 UEFA Europa League runner-up: 2021–22

References

External links

2004 births
Living people
Scottish footballers
Association football defenders
Scotland youth international footballers
Scottish Professional Football League players
Rangers F.C. players
Footballers from Glasgow
Lowland Football League players
Scotland under-21 international footballers